Major General Richard Opoku-Adusei (born 24 November 1954) is a Ghanaian military personnel and a former Chief of Army Staff of the Ghana Army. He served as Chief of Army Staff from 4 April 2013 – 9 Feb 2017.

References

Ghanaian military personnel
Living people
Chiefs of Army Staff (Ghana)
1954 births